Armands Melnbārdis is a Latvian-born musician and recording artist.

Early life
Melnbārdis was born and raised in Riga, Latvia by his mother Helga Ingeborga Melnbārde, herself an accomplished artist and author.
His violin studies began at the young age of five at Emīls Dārziņš Music School Conservatory of Music, in Riga,. Armand began touring internationally at the age of twelve. In 1992 after one of his solo performances in the famous Wagner Hall in Riga, he was offered to continue his education at Stetson University with world renown classical violinist Dr. Alvaro Gomez, where upon his arrival he became the concertmaster of Stetson Symphony. Melnbārdis toured throughout Europe and the USA since the early age of twelve, performing in Germany, France, Finland, Russia, United Kingdom, Wales, Scotland, Estonia, Lithuania, and Latvia.

Musical education
 Bachelor of Music, Stetson University, DeLand FL
 Rollins College · Master of Music Education · Music Education · Winter Park, Florida
 Emīls Dārziņš Music School Conservatory of Music, Riga, Latvia

Career

 Melnbārdi has performed or recorded with the following artists:

 He has performed with a number of Orchestras, in the US and Latvia:

 Melnbārdi has held the position of concertmaster with the United European International Orchestra Summit Cognac, France; and with the Stetson Symphony Orchestra, the Symphony Beach Club Ormond Beach Orchestra, and the Stetson Chamber Orchestra, all in DeLand, Florida.
 Ormond Beach Symphony, and the Stetson University Orchestra have featured him as soloist.
 He has been first violinist with the Vio7 String Quartet, the Barron String Quartet, and the Ormond String Quartet.

Television Performances

 "ARMAND Live From New York City" (TBN)
 "ARMAND & ROB ROCK Christmas Special" (#1) (TBN)
 "ARMAND & ROB ROCK Christmas Special" (#2) (TBN)
 "Carman Halloween Special" (TBN)
 "Christmas with N'Sync" (MTV, VH1)

Studio albums

 Vio7 The Seventh String (7-string rock; metal violin)
 Vintage Colours (smooth jazz violin)
 Pure Vanilla Christmas (classical, jazz, Broadway)
 Upon The Christmas Night (jazz, pop, classical, Christian)
 Dig With Heaven and Earth (2013)

Recognition and awards

 A.S.T.A. Young Artist Competition in Miami, Florida
 Stetson University Concerto Competition, DeLand, Florida
 Upcoming Classical Stars Competition, Riga, Latvia

References

External links
http://www.songweavers.com/about.php?member=armandvio7
http://www.metaltalk.net/columns/20100204.php
http://www.sugarbuzzmagazine.com/bands/vio7/vio7.html
http://www.artistdirect.com/artist/credits/armand-melnbardis/10624670
http://www.seaoftranquility.org/reviews.php?op=showcontent&id=7182
http://metalcrypt.wordpress.com/2009/.../armand-melnbardis-of-vio7-intervie...
http://www.emergenza.net/US/en-us/.../armand-melnbardis.aspx
https://web.archive.org/web/20120204125226/http://www.robrock.com/index2.html
http://violinsrule.libsyn.com/episode-10-no-guitars-needed-armand-shreds-wit...
https://myspace.com/armandvio7
http://www.tvnet.lv/izklaide/popkultura/42628-helga_ingeborga_melnbarde_visu_pati_fire

Latvian classical violinists
Child classical musicians
Stetson University alumni
Year of birth missing (living people)
Living people
Rock violinists
Musicians from Riga
21st-century classical violinists